Pakit Santhisiri (born 11 September 1948) is a Thai judoka. He competed in the men's lightweight event at the 1976 Summer Olympics.

References

1948 births
Living people
Pakit Santhisiri
Pakit Santhisiri
Judoka at the 1976 Summer Olympics
Place of birth missing (living people)
Pakit Santhisiri